Golpe al corazón (English: Strike to the Heart) is a 2017 Argentine telenovela produced and broadcast by Telefe from September 11, 2017, to March 2, 2018.

Plot
Rafa Farías (Sebastián Estevanez) was a boxer, and his pregnant wife died in a car crash. Reasoning that his wife died because the ambulance did not arrive to the site in time, he ends his boxing career and becomes a nurse instead. He consented with the removal of his late wife's eyes for organ donation. Those benefited Marcela Ríos (Eleonora Wexler), who had become blind during a street attack. In present day, both of them work at the same clinic. She is married to Javier Mansilla (Ramiro Blas), who had caused the crash by falling a sleep while driving, and then escaped without helping the crash victim.

Production
The filming of the telenovela started in July. It was meant as a telenovela for the prime time, meant to compete with Las Estrellas from El Trece. It is produced by Quique Estevanez. The airing time became controversial, as Telefe had already aired the telenovela Fanny la fan in the prime time, and cancelled it after a week because of its poor ratings. The production announced the first airing date, September 11, during a press conference at Puerto Madero.

Sabrina Rojas, a model who became famous in Showmatch, made her initial work as an actress in this telenovela.

Actress Manuela Pal plays the villain, and complained about the hot scenes shot in the telenovela.

Cast

Protagonists
Sebastián Estevanez as Rafael Farías
Eleonora Wexler as Marcela Ríos

Antagonist
Claudia Lapacó as Chuna Mansilla
Facundo Espinosa as Leandro Zárate †
Ramiro Blas as Javier Mansilla †
Manuela Pal as Erika Martín
Esteban Pérez as Nicolás Linares

Recurring cast 
María del Cerro as Lucrecia
Stefano de Gregorio as Diego Armando "Peti" Figueroa
Julián Serrano as Alejo Ferrari 
Miguel Ángel Rodríguez as Pedro Palacio
Viviana Saccone as María Catalina López
Georgina Barbarossa as Graciela 
Julia Calvo as Marta Medina
Victorio D'Alessandro as Santiago Medina/Santiago Palacio López Medina
Marcelo De Bellis as Willy
Natalia Lobo as Nancy
Johanna Francella as Celeste Farías
Laura Laprida as Evelina Mansilla
Franco Pucci as Joaquín Palacio
Sabrina Rojas as Julieta
Germán Kraus as Francisco Di Cesare †
Fabio Aste as Pablo
Sebastián Cura as Lalo
Sonia Zavaleta as Anita
Liliana Benard as Reina

Participations
Sabrina Garciarena as Paula Solano de Farías †
Eva De Dominici as Rita
Inés Palombo as Yesica Perotti
Agustín Sierra as ex Boxing partner of Rafael
Ezequiel Castaño
Edgardo Moreira as Pérez Calderón
Luly Drozdek as Carla
Bárbara Funes as Paloma
Patricio Bettini as Cárdenas
Pacha Rosso as Galván
Wanda Nara as Guadalupe
Juan Luppi as Facundo
Jennifer Biancucci as Fanny
Fabián Vena as Franco Rocamora
Bárbara Vélez as Camila
Fabián Mazzei as Fernando
José Luis Gioia as Osqui
Graciela Tenembaum as Leticia
Fabián Arenillas as Felipe
Ignacio Pepe as Bruno Rocamora
Marcelo Melingo as Levin
Brian Muñiz as Gastón
Cristina del Valle

References

External links
 Official site

2017 telenovelas
Argentine telenovelas
Telefe telenovelas
Spanish-language telenovelas
2017 Argentine television series debuts
2018 Argentine television series endings